Friedrich Hirth, Ph.D. (16 April 1845 in Gräfentonna, Saxe-Gotha – 10 January 1927 in Munich) was a German-American sinologist.

Biography
He was educated at the universities of Leipzig, Berlin, and Greifswald (Ph.D., 1869). He was in the Chinese Maritime Customs Service from 1870 to 1897. In 1902, Professor Hirth was appointed to the first Dean Lung Professorship of Chinese at Columbia University (New York City).

Prior to World War II, a collection of Chinese manuscripts and printed books made by him was in the Royal Library at Berlin, and another of porcelains of considerable historical importance in the Gotha Museum; most of the Hirth collection from the Staatsbibliothek in Berlin is now in Kraków. As an investigator he conducted researches in Chinese literature by imitation of the methods of classical philology.

Works
  Translates and annotates a merchant log dealing with the Superintendent of Customs or "Hoppo".
 China and the Roman Orient: Researches into their Ancient  and Mediœval Relations as Represented in Old Chinese Records (1885)  
 Ancient Porcelain: A Study in Chinese Mediœval Industry and Trade (1888)
 Text-Book of Documentary Chinese (two volumes, 1885–88) 
 Hsin-kuan wên-chien-lu: text book of documentary Chinese, with a vocabulary for the special use of the Chinese customs service (1885)
 新關文件錄 (1909)
 Notes on the Chinese documentary style (1888)
 Notes on the Chinese documentary style (1888)
 Chinesische Studien, volume i (1890)  
 Index of the Characters in Dr. Hirth's "Text Book of Documentary Chinese," Arranged by Their Radicals: With a List Giving Their Tones (1892)
 Ueber fremde Einflüsse in der chinesischen Kunst (1896)
 Scraps from a Collector's Note-book, Being Notes on Some Chinese Painters of the Present Dynasty, with Appendices on Some Old Masters and Art Historians (1905) 
 Syllabary of Chinese sounds (1907)
 Research in China ...: pt. 1. Descriptive topography and geology, by Bailey Willis, Eliot Blackwelder, and R.H. Sargent. pt. 2. Petrography and zoology, by Eliot Blackwelder. Syllabary of Chinese sounds, by Friedrich Hirth (1907)
 Chinese metallic mirrors: with notes on some ancient specimens of the Musée Guimet, Paris (1907)
 Research in China ...: pt. 1. Descriptive topography and geology, by Bailey Willis, Eliot Blackwelder, and R.H. Sargent. pt. 2. Petrography and zoology, by Eliot Blackwelder. Syllabary of Chinese sounds, by Friedrich Hirth (1907)
 Research in China ...: Systematic geology, by Bailey Willis (1907)
 The Ancient History of China to the End of the Chou Dynasty (New York: Columbia University Press, 1908) 1911 edition
  CHAU JU-KUA: His Work on the Chinese and Arab Trade in the twelfth and thirteenth Centuries, entitled Chu-fan-chï, Translated from the Chinese and Annotated by FRIEDRICH HIRTH and W. W. ROCKHILL, (1911)  with W. W. Rockhill  
 Research in China ... (1913)
 The Story of Chang K'ie'n, China's Pioneer in Western Asia'' (1917)
 Native sources for the history of Chinese pictorial art (1917)

See also
 Zhao Rugua

Notes

References

External links

Columbia University faculty
Columbia University librarians
Leipzig University alumni
Humboldt University of Berlin alumni
University of Greifswald alumni
German sinologists
German emigrants to the United States
1845 births
1927 deaths
German male non-fiction writers